Giovanni Abate (born 2 July 1981) is an Italian footballer who currently plays as a striker for Flaminia Civita Castellana. Previously he played for Pro Piacenza and various other teams in Italy.

References

External links
 
 

1981 births
Living people
Italian footballers
Association football forwards
Palermo F.C. players
U.S. Avellino 1912 players
U.S. Viterbese 1908 players
Taranto F.C. 1927 players
S.S.D. Città di Gela players
A.S.D. Victor San Marino players
A.S.D. Portogruaro players
Mantova 1911 players
Trapani Calcio players
Brescia Calcio players
Serie B players
Serie C players
People from Crotone
Virtus Francavilla Calcio players
Footballers from Calabria
Sportspeople from the Province of Crotone